"Red Flags" is a song by British singer and songwriter Mimi Webb, from her debut studio album Amelia. It was released on 13 January 2023 through Epic Records as the third single from the album. The song debuted at number 23 on the UK Singles Chart, later rising to a peak of number twelve.

Production
The song was co-produced by Cirkut (real name Henry Walter), who had also worked with Webb on her previous single, "Ghost of You". As well as his work with Webb, Cirkut has written and produced songs for other leading artists including "Wrecking Ball" with Miley Cyrus, "Dark Horse" for Katy Perry and Maroon 5's "Sugar".

Webb also revealed in an interview with the Official Charts Company "I wrote this with Connor McDonough, Riley McDonough and their brother Toby McDonough and with CASTLE and Ryan Daly [Cirkut also helped produce and co-write the track]. We wrote it at the end of last summer. We did a lot of really sick songs that are on the album."

Composition and lyrics
According to the Official Charts Company, the main theme of the song is "Mimi [beginning] to wonder why she's staying in a situation she should be well shot of" and seeing how "those red flags can actually seem a bit green". 

Webb herself describes it as a "revenge song", saying "I was very in love, I think sometimes you want what you can't have. It can be really challenging and you have to have such a discipline to walk away. For me, I look back at our old conversations and, honestly, that person was really trying to get me to get break up with them. I didn't even see it! I thought it was all green flags."

Live performances
Webb made several guest appearances on TV shows to promote the single, performing live on The Graham Norton Show on Friday 10th February 2023 She also appeared on The Late Show with Stephen Colbert to perform the song on 16 January 2023.
Following the release of her album, Amelia, Webb featured in the "End of the Show Show" on Ant and Dec's Saturday Night Takeaway, aired live on Saturday 4th March 2023, performing '"Red Flags".

Charts

References

2023 songs
2023 singles
Epic Records singles
Mimi Webb songs
Song recordings produced by Cirkut (record producer)
Songs written by Cirkut (record producer)
Songs written by Mimi Webb